Johann Mühlegg (born 8 November 1970 in Ostallgäu, Germany) is a former top level cross-country skier who competed in international competitions first representing Germany and then Spain, after becoming a Spanish citizen in 1999. He was excluded and disqualified from the 2002 Winter Olympics in Salt Lake City for doping.

Early career
Mühlegg participated for Germany in the 1992, 1994 and 1998 Winter Olympics, even though he began having trouble with Germany's ski federation in 1993. From the beginning, Mühlegg singled himself out, at one point accusing German head coach Georg Zipfel for "damaging him spiritually" (the so-called Spiritistenaffäre). He was thrown off the team in 1995, but was reinstated later. But from that moment on, the ever eccentric Mühlegg insisted on taking a flask of holy water with him at all times, and trusting only his Portuguese cleaning woman/chaperone Justina Agostinho. In the end, Mühlegg was branded as a team cancer and was thrown out.

Competing for Spain
After being ejected from the national team after the 1998 Nagano Games, his good relations with members of the Spanish cross-country skiing team, in particular Juan Jesús Gutiérrez Cuevas and Haritz Zunzunegui, opened the door for Mühlegg to obtain Spanish citizenship.

In late 1999, competing for Spain, he won a World Cup race for the first time. At the 2001 FIS Nordic World Ski Championships in Lahti, he won two medals with a silver in the 10 km + 10 km combined pursuit (stepping up when the original medalist Jari Isometsä was disqualified for hemohes use), and a gold in the 50 km freestyle race. These are the only medals ever that Spain has won at the FIS Nordic World Ski Championships.

In the 2002 Winter Olympics in Salt Lake City, Mühlegg won gold medals in the 30 km freestyle and the 10 km + 10 km pursuit races, the successes gaining him congratulations from King Juan Carlos I of Spain.

Mühlegg finished first in the 50 km classical race held on the final Saturday of the Salt Lake City Winter Olympic Games on 23 February 2002 but was disqualified from that race and was expelled from the Games the next day, after testing positive for darbepoetin (a medicine which boosts red blood cell count; the substance was not banned at the time since it had only recently been developed).

Doping controversy
Following the darbepoetin scandal, the International Olympic Committee (IOC) initially let Mühlegg keep his gold medals from the first two races. But in December 2003 a ruling by the Court of Arbitration for Sport (CAS) found that these medals should also be withdrawn. The CAS remitted this case as well as similar ones involving Olga Danilova and Larisa Lazutina (both from Russia) to the IOC Executive Board, which confirmed the rulings in February 2004.

Cross-country skiing results
All results are sourced from the International Ski Federation (FIS).

Olympic Games

World Championships
 2 medals – (1 gold, 1 silver)

World Cup

Season standings

Individual podiums
7 victories
12 podiums

See also
Cross-country skiing at the 2002 Winter Olympics
List of sportspeople sanctioned for doping offences

Notes

References

External links

Olympic 4 x 10 km relay results: 1936-2002 

1970 births
Living people
German emigrants to Spain
Doping cases in cross-country skiing
German male cross-country skiers
Spanish male cross-country skiers
German sportspeople in doping cases
Spanish people of German descent
Spanish sportspeople in doping cases
Cross-country skiers at the 1992 Winter Olympics
Cross-country skiers at the 1994 Winter Olympics
Cross-country skiers at the 1998 Winter Olympics
Cross-country skiers at the 2002 Winter Olympics
Olympic cross-country skiers of Germany
Olympic cross-country skiers of Spain
Competitors stripped of Winter Olympics medals
FIS Nordic World Ski Championships medalists in cross-country skiing
FIS Cross-Country World Cup champions
Sportspeople from Swabia (Bavaria)
People from Ostallgäu